The Jebb Baronetcy, of Trent Place in the County of Essex, was a title in the Baronetage of Great Britain. It was created on 4 September 1778 for Richard Jebb, Physician-in-Extraordinary to George III. The title became extinct on his death in 1787.

Jebb baronets, of Trent Place (1778)
Sir Richard Jebb, 1st Baronet (1729–1787)

References

External links
Royal College of Physicians Sir Richard Jebb

Extinct baronetcies in the Baronetage of Great Britain